Daniela Darquea (born 26 July 1995) is a professional golfer from Ecuador, currently playing on the LPGA Tour.

Amateur career 
Darquea attended the University of Miami and played golf with the Miami Hurricanes where she was WGCA All-American, All-American Scholar, All-ACC, All-ACC Academic in 2014. She won the Briar's Creek Invitational, Hurricane Invitational and Suntrust Gator Women's Invitational.

She represented Ecuador at the 2015 Pan American Games and 2016 Espirito Santo Trophy, and qualified for the 2015 U.S. Women's Open at Lancaster Country Club.

Professional career 
Darquea finished T29 at the 2016 LPGA Final Qualifying Tournament to earn partial status for the 2017 season. She decided to forego the remainder of her senior season and turn pro. She made one LPGA start in her rookie season and played mainly on the Symetra Tour, where she made the cut in 16 out of 22 starts and recorded six top-10 finishes, including a victory at the IOA Championship and a runner-up finish at the Symetra Classic.

In 2018, she played in 19 LPGA Tour events. She made 10 cuts and finished 95th on the money list, recording a season-best of T5 at the Marathon Classic. The following year she was 97th on the money list with a season-best T6 finish at the Walmart NW Arkansas Championship.

Darquea qualified for the 2020 Summer Olympics in Tokyo.

Amateur wins
2012 Abierto De Arrayanes, Copa Ron Abuelo, Abierto Damas de Lacosta Country Club, Abierto De Los Chillos Club Campestre
2013 Clasificacion Sudamericano Juvenil, Abierto de Arrayanes, AJGA Kansas Junior at Buffalo Dunes
2014 Hurricane Invitational, Suntrust Gator Women's Invitational
2015 Briar's Creek Invitational, Abierto del Quito Tenis y GC

Source:

Professional wins (1)

Symetra Tour wins (1)

Results in LPGA majors 
Results not in chronological order before 2019.

CUT = missed the half-way cut
NT = no tournament
T = tied

World ranking
Position in Women's World Golf Rankings at the end of each calendar year.

Team appearances
Amateur
Espirito Santo Trophy (representing Ecuador): 2016
Professional
Pan American Games (representing Ecuador): 2015
Bolivarian Games (representing Ecuador): 2017

References

External links 

Ecuadorian female golfers
LPGA Tour golfers
Olympic golfers of Ecuador
Golfers at the 2020 Summer Olympics
Miami Hurricanes women's golfers
Golfers at the 2015 Pan American Games
Pan American Games competitors for Ecuador
People from Quito
1995 births
Living people
21st-century Ecuadorian women